Muhammad Saif-ud-Din Khosa is a Pakistani politician who served as a member of the Provincial Assembly of the Punjab from July 2022 till January 2023. He had previously been a member of the National Assembly of Pakistan from February 2008 to May 2012.

Political career

He ran for the seat of the Provincial Assembly of the Punjab from Constituency PP-244 (Dera Ghazi Khan-V) and from Constituency PP-246 (Dera Ghazi Khan-VII) as a candidate of Pakistan Muslim League (N) (PML-N) in 2002 Pakistani general election but was unsuccessful. He received 13,801 votes from the Constituency PP-244 (Dera Ghazi Khan-V) and lost the seat to Syed Abdul Aleem, a candidate of National Alliance. He received 21,760 votes from the Constituency PP-246 (Dera Ghazi Khan-VII) and lost the seat to Sardar Muhammad Yousaf Khan Leghari, a candidate of National Alliance.

He was elected to the National Assembly of Pakistan from Constituency NA-173 (Dera Ghazi Khan-III) as a candidate of PML-N in 2008 Pakistani general election. He received 56,475 votes and defeated Awais Leghari. In the same election, he was elected to the Provincial Assembly of the Punjab from Constituency PP-243 (Dera Ghazi Khan-IV) as a candidate of PML-N but was unsuccessful. He received 22,508 votes and defeated Awais Leghari. He vacated the Punjab Assembly seat.

In May 2012, he quit PML-N and resigned from the National Assembly.

He ran for the seat of the National Assembly from Constituency NA-173 (Dera Ghazi Khan-III) as a candidate of Pakistan Peoples Party (PPP) in 2013 Pakistani general election but was unsuccessful. He received 60,258 votes and lost the seat to Awais Leghari. In the same election, he ran for the seat of the Provincial Assembly of the Punjab from Constituency PP-243 (Dera Ghazi Khan-IV) as a candidate of PPP but was unsuccessful. He received 2,069 votes and lost the seat to Zulfiqar Ali Khosa.

He ran for the seat of the Provincial Assembly of the Punjab from Constituency PP-243 (Dera Ghazi Khan-IV) as a candidate of PPP in by-polls held in August 2013, but was unsuccessful. He received 17,547 votes and lost the seat to Ahmad Ali Khan Dreshak.

He was elected to the Provincial Assembly of the Punjab from PP-288 (Dera Ghazi Khan-IV) as a candidate of the Pakistan Tehreek-e-Insaf in the 2022 Punjab provincial by-elections.

References

Living people
Baloch politicians
Pakistani MNAs 2008–2013
Year of birth missing (living people)